Michael H – Profession: Director is a 2013 documentary film directed by Yves Montmayeur about the Austrian film director Michael Haneke.

Cast
 Juliette Binoche as Herself
 Béatrice Dalle as Herself
 Michael Haneke as Himself
 Isabelle Huppert as Herself
 Susanne Lothar as Herself
 Emmanuelle Riva as Herself
 Jean-Louis Trintignant as Himself

References

External links
 

2013 television films
2013 films
2013 documentary films
Austrian documentary films
French documentary films
2010s French-language films
2010s German-language films
Documentary films about film directors and producers
Austrian multilingual films
French multilingual films
2010s French films